Donum may refer to:

 Dunam or Donum, a unit of area
 Regium Donum, funds for clergy
 Gift in Latin